Juqin (also Romanized as Jūqīn; also known as Chugun, Joqin, and Khūqīn) is a village in Golabar Rural District of the Central District of Ijrud County, Zanjan province, Iran. At the 2006 National Census, its population was 2,557 in 568 households. The following census in 2011 counted 2,854 people in 729 households. The latest census in 2016 showed a population of 3,129 people in 928 households; it was the largest village in its rural district.

References 

Ijrud County

Populated places in Zanjan Province

Populated places in Ijrud County